The National Cancer Institute (NCI) coordinates the United States National Cancer Program and is part of the National Institutes of Health (NIH), which is one of eleven agencies that are part of the U.S. Department of Health and Human Services. The NCI conducts and supports research, training, health information dissemination, and other activities related to the causes, prevention, diagnosis, and treatment of cancer; the supportive care of cancer patients and their families; and cancer survivorship.

NCI is the oldest and has the largest budget and research program of the 27 institutes and centers of the NIH ($6.9 billion in 2020). It fulfills the majority of its mission via an extramural program that provides grants for cancer research. Additionally, the National Cancer Institute has intramural research programs in Bethesda, Maryland, and at the Frederick National Laboratory for Cancer Research at Fort Detrick in Frederick, Maryland.

The NCI supports a nationwide network of 71 NCI-designated Cancer Centers with a dedicated focus on cancer research and treatment and maintains the National Clinical Trials Network.

History

Timeline 

 August 5, 1937: President Franklin D. Roosevelt signed into law the National Cancer Institute Act (Pub. Law 75-244; 50 Stat. 559), which established the National Cancer Institute, as a division of the Public Health Service.
 1940: The first issue of the Journal of the National Cancer Institute was published.
 1944: The United States Congress made the NCI an operating division of the National Institutes of Health by its passage of the Public Health Service Act. Congress later amended the Public Health Service Act with the National Cancer Act of 1971, to broaden the scope and responsibilities of the NCI "in order more effectively to carry out the national effort against cancer."
 1955: NCI established the Clinical Trials Cooperative Group Program, which included several research networks that conducted cancer clinical research primarily under the sponsorship of NCI.
 1957: The first cancer, choriocarcinoma, was cured with chemotherapy at NCI. 
 1960: NCI began funding government-supported cancer centers.
 1971: President Richard Nixon converted the U.S. Army's former biological warfare facilities at Fort Detrick, Maryland, to house research activities on the causes, treatment, and prevention of cancer.
 1971: The National Cancer Act of 1971 declares "war on cancer," establishes the National Cancer Advisory Board, and allots additional funding for cancer research.
 1975: The Frederick National Laboratory for Cancer Research opened in Frederick, Maryland, as a Federally Funded Research and Development Center
 1993: The NIH Revitalization Act of 1993 encourages NCI to expand its efforts in prostate cancer, breast and other cancers which primarily or solely affected women, and authorized increased appropriations. 
 1998: Establishes the Office of Cancer Complementary and Alternative Medicine to study pseudoscientific alternative medicine treatments for cancer
 2009: The American Recovery and Reinvestment Act of 2009 provided  in additional funding for the NIH; the NCI received  from that amount.
 2016: The 21st Century Cures Act increased funding for biomedical research. The "Cancer Moonshot" program promised additional support for cancer research.
On October 17, 2017, Norman Sharpless was sworn in as the 15th director of the National Cancer Institute. In April 2019, Sharpless left NCI to serve as the acting Commissioner of Food and Drugs. He returned to the institute in November 2019 as director.

Anti-cancer drug investigations

Organization 
The NCI is divided into several divisions and centers.

Intramural 
 Center for Cancer Research
 The CCR includes approximately 250 internal NCI research groups in Frederick and Bethesda.
 Division of Cancer Epidemiology and Genetics
 DCEG is made up of eight branches within the Trans-divisional Research Program.

Extramural 
 Division of Cancer Biology
 DCB oversees approximately 2000 grants per year in the areas of cancer cell biology; cancer immunology, hematology, and etiology; DNA and chromosome aberrations; structural biology and molecular applications; tumor biology and microenvironment; and tumor metastasis. "Special Research Programs" falling under the aegis of the DCB include: Physical Sciences-Oncology Network, Cancer Systems Biology Consortium, Oncology Models Forum, Barrett's Esophagus Translational Research Network, New Approaches to Synthetic Lethality for Mutant KRAS-Dependent Cancers, Molecular and Cellular Characterization of Screen-Detected Lesions, Fusion Oncoproteins in Childhood Cancers, and Cancer Tissue Engineering Collaborative.
 Division of Cancer Control and Population Sciences
 Division of Cancer Prevention
 Division of Cancer Treatment and Diagnosis
 DCTD supports eight research programs: The Biometric Research Program, The Cancer Diagnosis Program, The Cancer Imaging Program, The Cancer Therapy Evaluation Program, The Developmental Therapeutics Program, The Radiation Research Program, The Translational Research Program, and The Office of Cancer Complementary and Alternative Medicine.
 Division of Extramural Activities
 DEA processes and supports the thousands of grant applications NCI receives each year and compiles reports on the progress of research funded by the NCI's programs.

Office of the director 
 Center for Biomedical Informatics and Information Technology
 Center for Cancer Genomics
 CCG was created in 2011 and is responsible for management of The Cancer Genome Atlas and cancer genomics initiatives.
 Center for Cancer Training
 Center for Global Health
 Center for Strategic Scientific Initiatives 
 In the 1990s, the Unconventional Innovation Program was created to integrate interdisciplinary technology research with biological applications. It was reorganized in 2004 as the CSSI.
 Center to Reduce Cancer Health Disparities 
 Center for Research Strategy
 Coordinating Center for Clinical Trials
 Technology Transfer Center

Programs

NCI-designated Cancer Centers 
The NCI-designated Cancer Centers are one of the primary arms in the NCI's mission in supporting cancer research. There are currently 71 so-designated centers; 12 clinical cancer centers, 52 comprehensive cancer centers, and 7 basic laboratory cancer centers. NCI supports these centers with grant funding in the form of P30 Cancer Center Support Grants to support shared research resources and interdisciplinary programs. Additionally, faculty at the cancer centers receive approximately 75% of the grant funding awarded by the NCI to individual investigators.

The NCI cancer centers program was introduced in 1971 with 15 participating institutions.

National Clinical Trials Network 
The National Clinical Trials Network (NCTN) was formed in 2014, from the Cooperative Group program to modernize the existing system to support precision medicine clinical trials. With precision medicine, many patients must be screened to determine eligibility for treatments in development.

Lead Academic Participating Sites (LAPS) were chosen at 30 academic institutions for their ability to conduct clinical trials and screen a large number of participants and awarded grants to support the infrastructure and administration required for clinical trials. Most LAPS grant recipients are also NCI-designated cancer centers. NCTN also stores surgical tissue from patients in a nationwide network of tissue banks at various universities.

Developmental Therapeutics Program 

The NCI Development Therapeutics Program (DTP) provides services and resources to the academic and private-sector research communities worldwide to facilitate the discovery and development of new cancer therapeutic agents.

Under the label "Discovery & Development Services" several services are offered, among them the NCI-60 human cancer cell line screen and the Molecular Target Program.

In the Molecular Target Program thousands of molecular targets have been measured in the NCI panel of 60 human tumor cell lines. Measurements include protein levels, RNA measurements, mutation status and enzyme activity levels.

NCI-60 Human Tumor Cell Lines Screen 

The evolution of strategies at the NCI illustrates the changes in screening that have resulted from advances in cancer biology. The Developmental Therapeutics Program (DTP) operates a tiered anti-cancer compound screening program with the goal of identifying novel chemical leads and biological mechanisms. The DTP screen is a three phase screen which includes: an initial screen which first involves a single dose cytotoxicity screen with the 60 cell line assay. Those passing certain thresholds are subjected to a 5 dose screen of the same 60 cell-line panel to determine a more detailed picture of the biological activity. A second phase screen establishes the maximum tolerable dosage and involves in vivo examination of tumor regression using the hollow fiber assay. The third phase of the study is the human tumor xenograft evaluation.

Active compounds are selected for testing based on several criteria: disease type specificity in the in vitro assay, unique structure, potency, and demonstration of a unique pattern of cellular cytotoxicity or cytostasis, indicating a unique mechanism of action or intracellular target.

A high correlation of cytotoxicity with compounds of known biological mechanism is often predictive of the drugs mechanism of action and thus a tool to aid in the drug development and testing. It also tells if there is any unique response of the drug which is not similar to any of the standard prototype compounds in the NCI database.

Leadership

Notable NCI faculty 

 Amy Berrington de González, senior investigator and radiation epidemiology branch chief.
 Kathryn Zoon, Principal Deputy Director, 2002 to 2004.
 Michael B. Sporn was the Chief of the Laboratory of Chemoprevention, 1978 to 1995.
Tom Misteli, NIH Distinguished Investigator and Director of the NCI Center for Cancer Research
 Susan Gottesman
 Sankar Adhya
 Ira Pastan
 Elaine Jaffe
 Michael Gottesman
 Robert C. Gallo
 Michael Potter
 Sandra Wolin
 Charles J. Sherr
 Louis M. Staudt
 Gordon Zubrod
 Steven Rosenberg
 Alfred Singer, Chief of the Experimental Immunology Branch of the National Cancer Institute
 Xiaohong Rose Yang, senior investigator.
 Douglas R. Lowy, Chief, Laboratory of Cellular Oncology; NCI Principal Deputy Director, initial development, characterization, and clinical testing of the preventive virus-like particle-based HPV vaccines.

Notable people
 

Susan Shurin, senior adviser
Sudhir Srivastava, chief scientist at Cancer Biomarkers Research Group of the Division of Cancer Prevention

See also

 American Cancer Society Center
 caBIG, the Cancer BioInformatics Grid, a National Cancer Institute (USA) initiative to link cancer researchers and their data
 Cancer Information Service (CIS)
 European Organisation for Research and Treatment of Cancer (EORTC)
 Journal of the National Cancer Institute
 National Comprehensive Cancer Network
 NCI-designated Cancer Center

Notes and references

General references 
 National Cancer Institute Retrieved 11 June 2010.
 "NCI MISSION STATEMENT". National Cancer Institute. Retrieved 18 August 2004.
 "THE NATIONAL CANCER ACT OF 1971". National Cancer Institute. Retrieved 18 August 2004.
 Developmental Therapeutics Program (DTP)

External links 

 
 NCI account on USAspending.gov
 NCI Dictionaries: NCI Dictionary of Cancer Terms (utilizing non-technical language) • NCI Dictionary of Genetics Terms (for healthcare professionals) • NCI Drug Dictionary (includes links for potential clinical trials)
 NCI in A Short History of the National Institutes of Health, an online exhibit by the Office of NIH History
 Important Events in NCI History from the NIH Almanac
 Major NCI Milestones infographic

1937 establishments in the United States
75th United States Congress
Cancer organizations based in the United States
Medical research institutes in Maryland
National Cancer Centers
Cancer Institute
Organizations established in 1937